The 2018 Generali Open Kitzbühel was a men's tennis tournament played on outdoor clay courts. It was the 74th edition of the Austrian Open Kitzbühel, and part of the World Tour 250 series of the 2018 ATP World Tour. It took place at the Tennis stadium Kitzbühel in Kitzbühel, Austria, from July 30 through August 5.

Singles main draw entrants

Seeds

 1 Rankings are as of July 23, 2018

Other entrants
The following players received wildcards into the singles main draw:
  Corentin Moutet
  Dennis Novak
  Sebastian Ofner 

The following players received entry into the singles main draw as special exempts:
  Jozef Kovalík 
  Jürgen Zopp 

The following players received entry from the qualifying draw:
  Yannick Hanfmann
  Denis Istomin
  Martin Kližan 
  Jurij Rodionov

Withdrawals
Before the tournament
  Pablo Cuevas → replaced by  Radu Albot
  Richard Gasquet → replaced by  Taro Daniel
  Gaël Monfils → replaced by  Jaume Munar
  Guido Pella → replaced by  Nikoloz Basilashvili
  Albert Ramos Viñolas → replaced by  Mikhail Kukushkin
  João Sousa → replaced by  Laslo Đere

Doubles main draw entrants

Seeds

 Rankings are as of July 23, 2018

Other entrants
The following pairs received wildcards into the doubles main draw:
  Jürgen Melzer /  Philipp Petzschner 
  Jurij Rodionov /  Tristan-Samuel Weissborn

Withdrawals
During the tournament
  Dominic Thiem

Retirements
  Philipp Petzschner

Finals

Singles

  Martin Kližan defeated  Denis Istomin, 6–2, 6–2

Doubles

  Roman Jebavý /  Andrés Molteni defeated  Daniele Bracciali /  Federico Delbonis, 6–2, 6–4

References

External links
Official website

Generali Open Kitzbuhel
Austrian Open Kitzbühel
Austrian Open
Generali Open Kitzbühel
Generali Open Kitzbühel